Symmetrodes is a genus of moth in the subfamily Arctiinae.

Species
Symmetrodes sciocosma Meyrick, 1888
Symmetrodes platymelas Turner, 1940

References
Natural History Museum Lepidoptera generic names catalog

Lithosiini
Moth genera